The Invasion of Georgia could refer to several invasions of either the U.S. state of Georgia or the country of Georgia including:

Georgia (U.S. state) 
 Invasion of Georgia (1742), part of the War of Jenkins' Ear when Spanish forces attempted to seize the British colony of Georgia
 an Invasion of Georgia during the American War of Independence in April 1778 by British forces, St. Simons, GA#American Revolution
 Battle of Chickamauga, September 1863
 Burning of Atlanta, September 1864
 Battle of Peachtree Creek (July 1864)
 Battle of Atlanta (July 1864)
 Atlanta in the American Civil War
 General Sherman's March through Georgia during the American Civil War, November–December 1864

Georgia (country) 
 The 1921 Red Army invasion of Georgia
 The 2008 South Ossetia war which saw Russian forces invade and occupy parts of Northern Georgia

See also
 Invasion of South Georgia